Jannaschia pohangensis is a Gram-negative, aerobic and motile bacterium from the genus of Jannaschia which has been isolated from seashore sand from Pohang in Korea.

References

Rhodobacteraceae
Bacteria described in 2008